Madame Sans-Gêne  may refer to:
 Marie-Thérèse Figueur (1774–1861), French female soldier
 Catherine Hübscher  (1753–1835), wife of Marshal of France François Joseph Lefebvre, whose life has been dramatised in:
 Madame Sans-Gêne (play), an 1893 play by Victorien Sardou and Émile Moreau

 Madame Sans-Gêne (opera), a 1915 opera by Umberto Giordano
 Madame Sans-Gêne (1911 film), starring Gabrielle Réjane
 Madame Sans-Gêne (1925 film), starring Gloria Swanson
 Madame Sans-Gêne (1941 film), by Roger Richebé
 Madame Sans-Gêne (1945 film), featuring José Maurer
 Madame Sans-Gêne (1961 film), starring Sophia Loren

See also 
 Monsieur Sans-Gêne, a 1935 French romantic comedy film by Karl Anton